Khatayan may refer to:

Khatayan, Qazvin
Khatayan, Razavi Khorasan